Shaya may refer to:

Shaya (singer) (born 1983), Greek singer
Carol Shaya-Castro (born 1970), Israeli-American police officer, actress, and adult model
George Shaya (born 1946), Rhodesian footballer
Shaya Boymelgreen (born 1951), American real estate developer
Shaya FM, an Internet radio station
Shaya, a male genie in Shimmer and Shine

See also
Chaya (disambiguation)